This is a list of state visits made by Gjorge Ivanov, the 4th President of Macedonia.

List of State Visits

State visits hosted in Macedonia by Gjorge Ivanov

References

State visits by Macedonian leaders
Politics of North Macedonia
North Macedonia politics-related lists
Diplomatic visits by heads of state